is a railway station on the Namboku Line in Kita-ku, Sapporo, Hokkaido, Japan, operated by the Sapporo Municipal Subway. The station is numbered N01.

While situated relatively close to Shin-Kotoni Station on the Sasshō Line, there are no transfer passageways between the two stations.

Lines
Asabu Station is served by the Namboku Line, and forms the northern terminus of the line.

Platforms

Surrounding area
 Shin-Kotoni Station (Sasshō Line)
 National Route 231
 Sapporo Asabu Baseball Stadium
 Sapporo Kita Ward Gymnasium
 Kita ward, Shin Kotoni Community Center
 North Asabu Police Station
 Sapporo Asabu Post Office

See also
 List of railway stations in Japan

External links

 Sapporo Subway Stations
 Station map (in Japanese)

 

Railway stations in Japan opened in 1978
Railway stations in Sapporo
Sapporo Municipal Subway
Kita-ku, Sapporo